Cuban–Chinese relations are the interstate relations between the People's Republic of China and Republic of Cuba. The origins of the relations began when the Qing dynasty established a consulate in Havana while Cuba was a still a colony of Spain in 1879. In 1902, the Qing dynasty recognized the independence of the Republic of Cuba from the United States, which had taken it from Spain in 1898. Cuba recognised the PRC in September 1960.

The relations are based on trade, credits, and investments, which have increased significantly since the 1990s. China is Cuba's second-largest trading partner after Venezuela. At a ceremonial trade gathering in Havana in early 2006, China's ambassador to Cuba said, "Our government has a firm position to develop trade co-operation between our countries. The policy, the orientation, has been determined. What's left is the work to complete our plans."
Although both Cuba and China are ruled by a communist party, they were on different sides during the Cold War, with Cuba being an ally of the Soviet Union, which China usually opposed following the Sino-Soviet Split.

China and Cuba have respect for each other's sovereign internal affairs and as a result experience good mutual relations such as being members of the Belt and Road Initiative for trade. China has partnered with Cuba to upgrade the rail network and other initiatives.

Commerce

Bilateral trade between China and Cuba in 2005 totaled US$777 million, of which US$560 million were Chinese exports to Cuba. Bilateral trade between China and Cuba in 2014 totaled US$1.6 billion. China is sending a growing amount of durable goods to Cuba. Chinese goods have become the primary tools both in the planned revitalization of Cuban transport infrastructure and in the "Energy Revolution" of 2006 to provide electricity to the Cuban population. Some large-scale transactions include:

Transportation
As of mid-2006, Cuba had purchased 100 locomotives from China for US$130 million.

As of early 2006, Cuba had signed a contract for 1,000 Chinese buses for urban and inter-provincial transportation.

Refrigerators
The Cuban government is replacing older appliances with newer, more energy-efficient models, including (as of early 2006) 30,000 Chinese refrigerators.

Investments

Nickel
As of 2004, China had agreed to planning to invest US$500 million in the completion and operation of Las Camariocas, an unfinished processing facility from the Soviet era. Under the agreement, Cubaníquel, the state-run nickel producer, owns 51 percent and Chinese-government owned Minmetals Corporation owns 49 percent. Financing for the project is from the China Development Bank, with Sinosure, the Chinese Export and Credit Insurance Corporation, providing guarantees.

Oil
SINOPEC, the Chinese state oil company, has an agreement with state-owned CUPET (Cuba Petroleum) to develop oil resources. As of mid-2008, SINOPEC had done some seismic testing for oil resources on the island of Cuba, but no drilling. The company also has a contract for joint production in one of Cuba's offshore areas of high potential yield, off the coast of Pinar del Río, but had done no off-shore drilling as of mid-2008.

In November 2005, PetroChina Great Wall Drilling Co., Ltd. and CUPET held a ceremony for the signing of two drilling service contracts, to provide di; Great Wall Drilling has provided drilling rigs for oil exploration on Cuba's north coast.

Biotechnology
In December 2005, the two countries signed an agreement to develop biotech joint ventures within the next three to five years. Two manufacturing plants using Cuban technology and processes, were operating in China as of early 2006.

Political and military relations
In 1912, the Cuban government established relations with the Beiyang government of the Republic of China in Peking. This continued with  Nationalist government in Nanking and Taipei after losing most of its territory. Both countries were allies in both World War II and the Korean War. From September 1960, post-revolutionary Cuba shifted recognition to the People's Republic of China.

In the late 1990s, China provided the Cuban government with equipment to block signals from Radio Martí.

Chinese president and Party general secretary Hu Jintao visited Cuba in November 2004, and Chinese president and Party general secretary Xi Jinping visited Cuba in July 2014.

Chinese personnel have been operating two intelligence signal stations in Cuba since early 1999.

Cuba was one of 53 countries, that in June 2020, backed the Hong Kong national security law at the United Nations.

Other areas of cooperation

 In 2004, China opened a local Confucius Institute in Havana.
Scientific and technical exchange and innovation in the industrial and agriculture sectors
Cultural exchanges
Medical, education and training exchanges
Energy and transport infrastructure

Resident diplomatic missions
 China has an embassy in Havana.
 Cuba has an embassy in Beijing and consulates-general in Guangzhou and Shanghai.

See also

 Caribbean–China relations
 Chinese Cubans
 Belt and Road Initiative
 Foreign relations of Cuba
 Foreign relations of China

References

Further reading
 Jiang Zemin, The Future of Socialism Remains as Bright as Ever, Excerpt from remarks to Fidel Castro (Selected Works, Vol I, p. 327-330)
 Hearn, Adrian H. (2012), China, Global Governance and the Future of Cuba, in: Journal of Current Chinese Affairs, 41, 1, 155–179. 
 Hearn, Adrian H. Cuba and China: Lessons and Opportunities for the United States Commissioned report for the CubaInfo Series; The Cuban Research Institute, Florida International University, June 2009z

External links
Chinese delegate Li Baodong praises Cuba's human rights record during the review of Cuba by the United Nations Human Rights Council's Universal Periodic Review, February 5, 2009

 
Cuba
Bilateral relations of Cuba